Margariti is a village and a former municipality in Thesprotia, Epirus, Greece. Since the 2011 local government reform it is part of the municipality Igoumenitsa, of which it is a municipal unit. The municipal unit has an area of 149.223 km2. Population 2,491 (2011).

Name
The toponym Margariti is thought to come from Margaritos, a pirate of the Emirate of Sicily to whom the Crusader Normans surrendered their holdings on the Ionian coast in the 12th century. The toponym is of uncertain origin and is attested for the first time during the 16th century. In the local Albanian speech it is known as Margëlliç and in Ottoman Turkish as Margliç. This form is attested since 1611, when Gjon Mekuli from Parga reports to the Venetians that Marghelici had been affected by the plague. Historical documents almost always use the form Margariti.

History
Various ancient sites have been located in the vicinity of the modern settlement. There is a possibility that Margariti was founded before the 16th century.

The Ottoman fort of Margariti was built in the first half of the 16th century. Margariti was the administrative center of the nahiye of Mazaraki which in 1551 was renamed to Margariti. The name refers to the Mazërreku clan which lived in the region. It had 38 and 35 villages in 1551 and 1613 respectively. Margariti itself had 17 and 20 households in 1551 and 1613 respectively. It was located on the Venetian-Ottoman borderlands of the time. The locals of the areas of Paramythia, Parakalamos and Margariti were specifically harassed by the Venetians and the inhabitants of Venetian Corfu in violation of the Ottoman-Venetian treaty of 1540. In 1570, the Venetian commander Girolamo Zane unsucccesfuly attacked the fort of Margariti. In 1571, a group of Albanians from Margariti traveled to Corfu and asked for assistance to take the fort of Margariti from the Ottomans. The Venetian governor of Corfu initially assessed that the force of the group was too small (200-250 men) for the attack. After the Battle of Lepanto crucial support was provided by armed units during the second siege of Margaritio (November 10–14, 1571); revolutionary leader Petros Lantzas became a key figure by organizing the military movements and securing the cooperation of the population in the surrounding region.

A larger force which also included local groups from Parga and Paramythia under the Venetian commander Sebastiano Venier was assembled and attacked the fort of Margariti, which was seized and burnt after a four-day siege. The fall of Margariti had a profound impact in the Christian states of the West as well as among the Greek population of Epirus that lived under Ottoman rule. Venice commissioned a painting for Doge's Palace to commemorate the destruction of the fort of Margariti. This was one of the last acts of Venetian incursions in Ottoman territory and in the following decades, the region stoppen being a battleground district.

Local Muslim converts appear in Margariti as the 16th century. Psimuli (2016) notes that the conversion to Islam of the guard of Margariti which came from the local medieval Albanian clan Mazaraki must have been finalized before 1571. A century later (1670), when Evliya Çelebi passed through Margariti he noted that within the citadel of Margariti were 200 houses and another 1,200 were located in the town which had developed around it. At this time, the town of Margariti has mainly converted to Islam. Çelebi recorded two mosques in the town, but no churches. The position of Margariti at the Venetian-Ottoman border was a cause of friction as the interests of the Venetian and the Albanian beys of Margariti conflicted for the control of the agricultural territory between Parga and the inland territory.  In the Ottoman period it was the  centre of the kaza of Margariti, inhabited by Greek and Albanian speaking communities. The local Albanian family of Çapari emerged in this era. By the end of the 18th century, Hasan Çapari the leading figure of the family owned the entire plain of Fanari (to the south of Margariti). Cham Albanian landlords of Margariti and Paramythia were in conflict with Ali Pasha of Yannina during much of the Pashalik of Yanina era.

In February 1913, Margariti was taken by the Greek army and joined Greece following the Treaty of London. During that period all village elders of the region gathered and declared that they would resist the incorporation of the area into Greece, while some local beys were ready to accept Greek control. At that time the town had a mixed population of Greeks and Cham Albanians. Chams were expelled from the town by ELAS as a result of the Cham collaboration with the Axis occupation forces. Population movements to the town that occurred from the middle of the 19th century weakened the Muslim elite and led to the gradual Hellenization of former Albanian-majority towns in the area such as Margariti in the 1920s. During the interwar period, Margariti was among the important towns of the Cham Albanian community located in the coastal region of the Greek part of Chameria and a centre of the Albanian speaking area.

At the beginning of the Axis occupation as soon as the town was occupied by Fascist Italian troops (1941), armed Cham Albanian groups under J. Sadik committed a number of atrocities and massacres. Almost all Cham Albanian monuments of Margariti were destroyed during World War II. During the end of World War II most Muslim families of the region were relocated north of Ioannina under Nazi German instructions. The region of Margariti together with Mazaraki, was among the first to produce resistance units in Thepsrotia in order to deal with the activity of Muslim Cham Albanian groups.

Province
The province of Margariti was one of the provinces of the Thesprotia Prefecture. Its territory corresponded with that of the current municipal units Margariti and Perdika. It was abolished in 2006.

Notable residents
Hamdi Çami, deputy of Preveza in the Ottoman Parliament
Jakup Veseli, representative of Chameria in Vlora Congress, signatory of Albanian Declaration of Independence.
Konstantinos Zakas (1916–1986) Greek Army General.

See also
Population exchange between Greece and Turkey

References

Sources 

Populated places in Thesprotia
Provinces of Greece
Former Cham settlements